Yellow Fingers is a 1926 American silent drama film directed by Emmett J. Flynn and written by Eve Unsell. The film stars Olive Borden, Ralph Ince, Claire Adams, Edward Peil, Sr., Otto Matieson, and Nigel De Brulier. The film was released on March 21, 1926, by Fox Film Corporation.

Cast

Preservation status
The film is preserved with a copy located in Europe.

References

External links

1926 films
1920s English-language films
Fox Film films
Silent American drama films
1926 drama films
Films directed by Emmett J. Flynn
American black-and-white films
American silent feature films
1920s American films